José Díaz (born 20 April 1938) is an Argentine former footballer who competed in the 1960 Summer Olympics.

References

1938 births
Living people
Association football defenders
Argentine footballers
Olympic footballers of Argentina
Footballers at the 1960 Summer Olympics
Club Atlético Lanús footballers
Pan American Games medalists in football
Pan American Games gold medalists for Argentina
Footballers at the 1959 Pan American Games
Medalists at the 1959 Pan American Games